Harun va Sakez (also Romanized as Hārūn va Sakez; also known as Hārūn Sagez, Hārūn Sakez, and Hārūn Sakkez) is a village in Fedashkuyeh Rural District, Shibkaveh District, Fasa County, Fars Province, Iran. At the 2006 census, its population was 157, in 33 families.

References 

Populated places in Fasa County